Le Phare de Majunga was a French language weekly newspaper published from Majunga, Madagascar. The newspaper was founded in 1908.

External links
Le Phare de Majunga archive at the French National Library

References

French-language newspapers published in Africa
Newspapers published in Madagascar
1908 establishments in Madagascar
Publications established in 1908